Aleko Bregu (born 2 July 1957) is an Albanian footballer. He played in two matches for the Albania national football team from 1980 to 1982.

References

External links
 

1957 births
Living people
Albanian footballers
Albania international footballers
Place of birth missing (living people)
Association football defenders
FK Dinamo Tirana players